is a passenger railway station in located in the city of Iga,  Mie Prefecture, Japan, operated by the private railway operator Iga Railway.

Lines
Shijuku Station is served by the Iga Line, and is located 6.5 rail kilometers from the starting point of the line at Iga-Ueno Station.

Station layout
The station consists of a single 47 m long side platform serving the bidirectional single line. The station is unattended.

Platform

Adjacent stations

History
Another station also named Shijuku previously existed approximately 300 m from the location of the new station until services were suspended in June 1945 and formally closed in May 1969.

Construction of the new station started in July 2017. The total construction cost is estimated at JPY246 million.

The name of the new station was announced by the city of Iga in October 2017.

Passenger statistics
In fiscal 2019, the station was used by an average of 87 passengers daily (boarding passengers only).

Surrounding area
 Iga City Office 
 Aeon Town Iga-Ueno shopping mall
 Iga City General Hospital

See also
List of railway stations in Japan

References

External links

  

Stations of Iga Railway
Railway stations in Mie Prefecture
Railway stations in Japan opened in 2018
Iga, Mie